Durham School is a fee-charging boarding and day school in the English public school tradition located in Durham, North East England and was an all-boys institution until 1985, when girls were admitted to the sixth form. The school takes pupils aged 3–18 years and became fully co-educational in 1998. A member of the Headmasters' and Headmistresses' Conference, it enrolls 650 day and boarding students. Its preparatory institution, known as Bow, Durham School, enrolls a further 160 pupils. Durham and Bow's former pupils include politicians, clergy and British aristocracy. Former students are known as Old Dunelmians. Founded by the Bishop of Durham, Thomas Langley, in 1414, it received royal foundation by King Henry VIII in 1541 following the Dissolution of the Monasteries during the Protestant Reformation. It is the city's oldest institution of learning.

History
The history of Durham School can be divided into three sections. Firstly there is the time from its founding by Langley in 1414, then in 1541 Henry VIII refounded it, and finally in 1844 the school moved from its site on Palace Green to its current location across the river Wear. The school is often referred to in histories and the Oxford Dictionary of National Biography as "Durham Grammar School". It should not be confused with the Chorister School, Durham. There is strong recorded evidence of the existence of the school pre-1414, for example Simon of Farlington an Archdeacon of Durham, gave the manor of Kyhou (Kyo) to the Almoner of Durham Cathedral Priory in 1180 'for the maintenance of 3 scholars of Durham School...'

To 1541
Durham School was founded by Thomas Langley in 1414, which was the foundation date accepted by the Clarendon Commission into public schools in 1861, making it the 18th oldest in Britain. It is possible, however, that it may actually have origins in the Priory at Lindisfarne, being moved to Durham City to escape marauding Viking invaders around the time that St. Cuthbert's body was brought to what is now the site of Durham Cathedral. The school was in Langley's time situated on the east side of Palace Green to the north of the cathedral.

1541 to 1844
At the time of the Dissolution of the Monasteries during the Protestant Reformation  in 1541, the school was refounded by Henry VIII. It remained in the same location, indeed the Headmaster Henry Stafford remained in post, during this period. In 1640 the "old School Buildings were utterly destroyed by the Scots, and the Head Master [Richard Smelt] retired to his Rectory of Easingwold where he took pupils" and the School was "recognised and endowed by the Parliamentary Commission 1652-3". Homeless due to the burning down of its buildings, the school continued in various houses in the city. 

It was in 1661 that the school moved to the building currently occupied by the Durham University Department of Music to the south west of Palace Green.

1844 to date
From its location on Palace Green outside Durham Cathedral, whilst Edward Elder was Headmaster the school moved to its present site in 1844. 
 The School has been steadily expanded and updated since then. For example:

Henry Holden, Headmaster 1853 to 1882, instigated new classrooms, dormitories, kitchens, sickroom then a sanatorium, bell tower and library.

William Fearon, Headmaster 1882 to 1884, introduced the three term system used today and enlarged the playing fields and built an open air swimming pool. He was also responsible, in 1882, for the concrete path alongside the River Wear between Hatfield College Boat House and Elvet Bridge.

Richard Budworth, Headmaster 1907 to 1932, oversaw great expansion in the School. In his tenure were added fives courts, a new boarding house in the Grove (a building now used for administration), Langley House, the Chapel (referred to below), new playing fields and classrooms, Poole House, the indoor swimming pool, the armoury and rifle range and the Kerr Arch. This arch, Grade II listed, was erected as the front entrance to the School and is in memory of G.C. Kerr, Cambridge Rowing Blue, Scottish rugby international and first civilian governor of the Sudan.

John Brett, Headmaster 1958 to 1967, saw the building of the cricket pavilion, new kitchens and laboratories and a new sanatorium.

Michael Vallance, Headmaster 1972 to 1982, opened a Junior House of boys age 11 to 13 named Ferens House (this closed in 2003), but the main developments in his tenure were the Budworth sports centre and Luce Theatre.

The key development in Michael Lang's time, Headmaster 1982, was the introduction of girls to the Sixth Form. There was also a new classroom block near the Budworth centre.

With Neil Kern as Headmaster, the principal developments included the introduction of girls throughout the School, making it fully co-educational, followed later by the creation of MacLeod House, and the all-weather sports pitch near the Chapel.

Ths school has been co-educational since 1985 and became independent from the Dean and Chapter of Durham Cathedral in 1996.

School site
The school is located to the west of Durham Cathedral and across the River Wear from it. The campus consists of a range of buildings, some of them listed, and sports fields. The school has a boathouse located on the bank of the river, just downstream of Prebends Bridge.

Chapel and war memorial

The school chapel, built from 1924 to 1926 during the tenure of Richard Budworth as headmaster, sits on top of a hill overlooking the main school site.

The building is used for services three times a week, with the major service held on Friday evenings, that the majority of pupils attend. The School is within the Anglican tradition.

The chapel is also the war memorial, its walls are engraved with the names of those who died in World War I and the further 79 who died in World War II. There are 97 steps to the chapel, one for each of the Old Dunelmians who died in World War I. (Note that the UKNIWM reference and Durham School's disagree on the number of World War I dead - 97 or 98.) The steps were re-laid in 1954.

A further war memorial, which predates the building of the Chapel, can be seen in St Margaret's, the local Parish Church. It consists of a large brass panel listing the names of former pupils fallen in the First World War and is fixed on the south side of the Chancel arch, with the Parish memorial facing it on the north side.

Academic subjects

A/AS Level
The School offers a range of subjects at A/AS Level, this varies from year to year as the needs of the students and the School change. Most students choose four subjects at AS Level, dropping to three at A-Level.

GCSE
Durham School, in common with most other schools, offers a varied curriculum at GCSE where students study mathematics, English Language and Literature and science (either the individual physics, chemistry and biology or a double award science course). All students study a core modern foreign language of either French, German or Spanish. There are then a number of options that the students can choose from.

Key Stage 3 (Years 7 to 9)
Durham School offers a range of subjects to students in Years 7 to 9 that lead into the GCSE programme starting, generally, in Year 10, with the exception of those in set 1 maths, who do their maths GCSE a year early. They start their course in Year 9.

Pastoral care
Pastoral care at Durham School is based around the house system:

House system

Although lessons are co-educational and sport takes place generally in year groups, for pastoral and sporting competition purposes, the school is divided into five different single sex houses. Each student is assigned to a house at the start of his or her time in the school and will, usually, remain in that house for the whole of their school career. The houses are separate buildings each with its own character in which the students are able to use the facilities and do private study. Currently the houses comprise:

School House boys are often nicknamed Bungites after the Headmaster Henry Holden who was also their Housemaster and himself nicknamed 'Bung' due to his ability to tell tall tales.

The Caffinites was also called The Second Masters House until it was renamed in 1924.

Co-curricular

Sport
With facilities that encompass playing fields, swimming pool, all-weather pitch and boathouse, Durham School has a wide-ranging sports programme that includes athletics, badminton, cricket, cross country, fencing, football, gym, hockey, netball, rounders, rowing, rugby, squash, swimming, tennis, golf and water polo.

Cricket
Along with rowing, cricket is the major boys sport for the summer term. The school considers cricket to be one of its high-profile sports, with the 1st XI competing against a number of high-profile teams such as the MCC. The cricket pavilion was built in 1960.

Hockey

The main sport for girls in winter is hockey. Each year a number of girls represent the county.  Hockey is also played by the boys, predominantly in the Easter term.

Rowing

Rowing has been a major sport at Durham School since at least 1838,. The Club aims to provide rowing opportunities to any who wish to be involved - "All year groups at the school have the opportunity to row at the appropriate level for their physiological and physical development" - and also wins at regattas and head races at home and abroad.

Rugby
The School has a number of playing fields, used predominantly for Rugby. The largest of these, Top Ground, was acquired in 1918. This has required work on its drainage over the years, 1921 and 1925 and again in 2009.

Durham School is the fourth or fifth oldest football club of any kind in the world and has produced many international rugby union players as well as introducing the game to Scotland. Durham School Football Club was founded in 1850 and was from 1890-1930 one of the rugby nurseries in England - this was first recognised by the Barbarians who honoured the school by playing a full side against the Old Dunelmians in 1897 (Barbarians won 18-5). Just before the First World War the school supplied four England players as well as a number of England triallists. Between 1920 and 1930 the school produced seven full internationals as well as several triallists (England, Scotland and British Lions). The headmaster during this great period was Richard Thomas Dutton Budworth who was himself a former England international and Barbarian. The history of the sport is celebrated in the annual Veterrimi IV Rugby Tournament.

Newcastle Falcons (originally Gosforth) rugby union club were founded as the old boys side and played in the school's colours until recently (green and white hoops).

Combined Cadet Force
The Combined Cadet Force (CCF) is a Ministry of Defence sponsored youth organisation within schools in the UK.  Durham School CCF has been running since it was formed as the Officer Training Corps (OTC) in 1914. The CCF is based in the Armoury and Range (previously there had been an air rifle range set up in the School House lavatories in 1906) built in 1926 and 1929 respectively.  Currently the CCF is a voluntary activity that students may opt into from Year 9 onwards consisting of three sections, The Royal Navy, The Army and The Royal Air Force.

Music
Centred on the Grade II listed Music School, Music is an important aspect of life at Durham School with a high profile in the School itself and also known in the region as a whole with concerts at The Sage Gateshead and in Durham Cathedral from time to time. The School offers music as an academic subject at both GCSE and A Level.

Drama
Centred on the Luce Theatre, also Grade II listed, a versatile space named after Canon Henry Luce, Headmaster 1932 to 1958, drama at Durham School is a key part of the academic and extra-curricular provision. Productions are varied and take place two or three times per year for different age groups.

Bow, Durham School

Bow, Durham School is the Durham School preparatory institution for pupils between the ages of 3 to 11 years. Founded in 1885 as Bow School, it was an all-male institution until becoming co-educational in 2006. The campus is situated one-half mile to the east of the senior school, overlooking the World Heritage Site, Durham Cathedral. Former pupils are known as ’Old Bowites’ and several prominent alumni include British politicians and members of the aristocracy, such as William Fletcher-Vane, 1st Baron Inglewood, Sir Brian Horrocks and Sir Gilbert Longden, and a number of professional sportsmen, such as Michael Philip Weston.

Notable headmasters 
1894–1899: Walter Hobhouse
1907–1932: Richard Budworth

Notable past pupils: Old Dunelmians

The past pupils of Durham School, referred to as Old Dunelmians, have been, and continue to be, found across the spectrum of public life, the armed services, the arts, the church and in sport. "Dunelmian" is derived from Dunelmensis, the Latin adjective of Durham. Their number include:

 Alexander Armstrong, actor, comedian, and singer, best known for hosting the BBC gameshow Pointless
John Laws (judge), (1945-2020) The Rt Hon Lord Justice Laws, High Court Judge between 1992 and 1999, when he came to the Court of Appeal
 Michael Gough, the actor best known for playing "Alfred" in the first four of the modern Batman films and comedian
 Field Marshal Henry Hardinge, 1st Viscount Hardinge, commander in chief of the British Army after The Duke of Wellington
 Anthony Salvin  (1799–1881), architect
 Christopher Smart, poet, (1722-1771)
 Granville Sharp, founder of Sierra Leone
 Geoff Parling, Premiership and International Rugby Player (Leicester Tigers, England, British and Irish Lions)
 Lieutenant-General Sir Brian Horrocks, British Army general who saw service in both World War I and World War II
 Dominic Cummings, British political advisor and strategist
 Edward Shortt, British politician, Home Secretary (1919–1922)
 William Greenwell, Church of England priest and archaeologist

References

External links 

 
 Independent Schools Inspectorate Inspection Reports
 Profile at the Independent Schools Council website

 
Boarding schools in County Durham
Educational institutions established in the 15th century
Schools in Durham, England
 
Member schools of the Headmasters' and Headmistresses' Conference
Private schools in County Durham
1414 establishments in England
Church of England private schools in the Diocese of Durham